Ovagiriya (ඔවාගිරිය පුරාවිද්‍යා භූමිය) is one of archaeological sites in Polwatta, Ampara District, Sri Lanka.

History

History of Ovagiriya archaeological ruins are dated back to the 5th century or before.  It is believed this ancient monastery to be a creation of King Kavantissa, the ruler of Ruhuna. Although there is no any archaeological evidences to corroborate this assumption.

With the time this site was ruined and again it was explored and discovered by the Archaeology Department of Sri Lanka in 1956 on a request of the Gal Oya Development Board. At the time of discovery most of ruins had been destroyed by the operations of the Gal Oya Development scheme.

Ruins
Among the ruins a stupa, an image house with a Buddha statue, Guard stones, stone pillars, Balustrades (Korawak gal), and flat clay tiles those used for roofing purposes, can be seen in this site. The stupa of here has been built on an unusual octagonal platform instead of a normal circular or square shaped platform. Which is one of unique features of this temple.

In 2008 the Chemical conservation division of the archaeology department commenced restoration of the 11.5 feet height handless granite Buddha statue in the image house. At the time of restoration, the shoulder portion of the statue was broken and fallen on the ground. Today the statue have been lifted and kept in the standing position.

These Ovagiriya ruins are scattered over about an area of 7-8 acres.

See also
 List of Archaeological Protected Monuments in Sri Lanka

References

External links
 අම්පාරේ ඔවාගිරිය

Buddhist temples in Ampara District
Stupas in Sri Lanka
Archaeological protected monuments in Ampara District